Željko Rebrača (born 9 April 1972) is a Serbian retired professional basketball player who is the president of Vojvodina. After playing in the National Basketball Association (NBA), he finished his career with the Spanish ACB League team Pamesa Valencia.

Professional career

Europe
Rebrača began his professional career in 1991, with KK Partizan. With KK Partizan, he won two Yugo League championships (1992 and 1995), three Yugoslav Cups (1992, 1994 and 1995), and the EuroLeague (1992).

In 1995–99, he played in the Italian League for Benetton Treviso, where he won the Italian League championship in 1997, under coach Mike D'Antoni. He followed up that by winning the Italian Supercup in 1997, and the FIBA Saporta Cup in 1999, while playing under coach Željko Obradović.

He also played for the European basketball giant Panathinaikos, during the 1999–2000 and 2000–01 seasons, winning with them two Greek League championships and one EuroLeague championship, at the EuroLeague Final Four in 2000, which was hosted in Thessaloniki. He was awarded with the EuroLeague Final Four MVP.

NBA
Rebrača, a 7'0" center, was a second round (54th overall) draft pick of the Seattle SuperSonics in the 1994 NBA draft. The Sonics immediately traded his NBA rights to the Minnesota Timberwolves, who then traded his rights to the Toronto Raptors in 1999, who in turn, traded his rights to the Detroit Pistons in 2001.

In the NBA, he played for the Detroit Pistons (2001–04), the Atlanta Hawks (2004), and the Los Angeles Clippers (2004–06). His most productive season was his rookie year, in which he averaged 6.9 points and 3.9 rebounds per game, as a member of the Detroit Pistons. His career NBA averages were 5.9 points per game and 3.2 rebounds per game, in 15.3 minutes per game.

Rebrača was plagued with heart problems. Those problems caused him to miss many games in his NBA career, including most of the first half of the 2005–06 NBA season. Rebrača had NBA career highs of 24 points (scored on 10 April 2002), and 16 rebounds (set on 29 January 2005).

Return to Europe
On 6 April 2007, after being on the injured list through the 2006–07 NBA season, Rebrača was waived by the Clippers, and on 19 June 2007 he signed with Pamesa Valencia, in the Spanish basketball league (ACB). On 17 December 2007 Rebraca announced his retirement from playing the game of basketball.

National team career
Rebrača was a member of the senior men's FR Yugoslavian national team (for which he became one of the Serbian MVPs). He won the gold medal with his national team at both EuroBaskets 1995 and 1997. With FR Yugoslavia, he also won the silver medal at the 1996 Atlanta Summer Olympics, in the United States.

1998 FIBA World Championship 

Rebrača won the gold medal at the 1998 FIBA World Championship as one of the key players of the depleted Yugoslavia roster that missed most of its ageing stars of the era such as Vlade Divac, Predrag Danilović or Žarko Paspalj, while team captain and 1997 European Championship MVP Aleksandar Đorđević played only limited minutes due to a recent injury.

Rebrača was instrumental in winning the closely fought final game against Russia with a block on Mikhail Mikhailov's dunk attempt, followed by a basket after an offensive rebound and finally, two free throws (despite his subpar 55% foul shooting in previous 8 games in the tournament), all in the final 35 seconds of the game.

Rebrača went on to make the all-tournament team averaging 13.6 points and 9.1 rebounds. With him anchoring the team's defense throughout the tournament (7 blocks against Greece in a second round game), clutch performances in the semi-finals against Greece (20 points and 13 rebounds) and the finals against Russia (16 points and 11 rebounds along with his late-game heroics), some argued that Rebrača should have been awarded the MVP honors that went to his teammate Dejan Bodiroga instead.

Post-playing career 
On 6 June 2022, Vojvodina elected Rebrača as their new club's president.

Personal life
Rebrača was one of the founding members of the Group Seven Children's Foundation.

His son Filip Rebrača currently plays basketball at the University of Iowa.

NBA career statistics

Regular season 

|-
| style="text-align:left;"| 
| style="text-align:left;"|Detroit
| 74 || 4 || 15.9 || .505 || – || .771 || 3.9 || 0.5 || 0.4 || 1.0 || 6.9
|-
| style="text-align:left;"| 
| style="text-align:left;"|Detroit
| 30 || 12 || 16.3 || .552 || – || .792 || 3.1 || 0.3 || 0.2 || 0.6 || 6.6
|-
| style="text-align:left;"| 
| style="text-align:left;"|Detroit
| 21 || 2 || 10.6 || .407 || – || .786 || 2.3 || 0.2 || 0.4 || 0.6 || 3.1
|-
| style="text-align:left;"| 
| style="text-align:left;"|Atlanta
| 3 || 0 || 17.0 || .522 || – || .500 || 3.0 || 0.7 || 0.0 || 0.7 || 8.3
|-
| style="text-align:left;"| 
| style="text-align:left;"|L.A. Clippers
| 58 || 2 || 16.0 || .568 || – || .859 || 3.2 || 0.4 || 0.2 || 0.7 || 5.8
|-
| style="text-align:left;"| 
| style="text-align:left;"|L.A. Clippers
| 29 || 2 || 14.2 || .542 || – || .756 || 2.2 || 0.3 || 0.2 || 0.7 || 4.7
|- class="sortbottom"
| style="text-align:center;" colspan="2"| Career
| 215 || 22 || 15.3 || .527 || – || .792 || 3.2 || 0.4 || 0.3 || 0.7 || 5.9

Playoffs 

|-
|style="text-align:left;"|2002
|style="text-align:left;”|Detroit
|5||0||13.8||.455||–||.786||2.0||0.0||0.2||0.2||4.2
|-
|style="text-align:left;"|2003
|style="text-align:left;”|Detroit
|4||0||7.3||.353||–||.714||1.3||0.0||0.0||0.0||4.3
|-
|style="text-align:left;"|2006
|style="text-align:left;”|L.A. Clippers
|3||0||7.3||.333||–||–||1.3||0.0||0.0||0.3||0.7
|- class="sortbottom"
| style="text-align:center;" colspan="2"| Career
| 12 || 0 || 10.0 || .387 || – || .762 || 1.6 || 0.0 || 0.1 || 0.2 || 3.3

See also

 List of Serbian NBA players

References

External links

Željko Rebrača Pictures
Two-time Euroleague champ Rebraca retires, ULEBCup.com, 19 December 2007

1972 births
Living people
1998 FIBA World Championship players
Atlanta Hawks players
Basketball players at the 1996 Summer Olympics
Basketball players at the 2000 Summer Olympics
Centers (basketball)
Detroit Pistons players
FIBA EuroBasket-winning players
FIBA World Championship-winning players
Greek Basket League players
KK Novi Sad players
KK Partizan players
Liga ACB players
Los Angeles Clippers players
Medalists at the 1996 Summer Olympics
National Basketball Association players from Serbia
Olympic basketball players of Yugoslavia
Olympic medalists in basketball
Olympic silver medalists for Serbia and Montenegro
Pallacanestro Treviso players
Panathinaikos B.C. players
People from Apatin
Seattle SuperSonics draft picks
Serbian basketball executives and administrators
Serbian expatriate basketball people in Greece
Serbian expatriate basketball people in Italy
Serbian expatriate basketball people in Spain
Serbian expatriate basketball people in the United States
Serbian men's basketball players
Valencia Basket players
Yugoslav men's basketball players